USS G. L. Brockenborough was a sloop captured  by the Union Navy during the American Civil War.

She was placed in service by the Navy as a gunboat to patrol navigable waterways of the Confederacy to prevent the South from trading with other countries. She also served as a ship's tender, providing help to other ships on blockade duty.

Service history 

G. L. Brockenborough (also spelled Brockenboro or G. L. Brockenboro) was a small sloop captured 15 October 1862 by Fort McHenry, Lt. E. Y. McCauley. G. L. Brockenborough had apparently been used as a blockade runner and was discovered after being scuttled in the Apalachicola River, Florida. She was subsequently raised and purchased at the Prize Court in Key West, Florida, by Rear Admiral James L. Lardner 15 November 1862.
 
Assigned to the East Gulf Blockading Squadron, G. L. Brockenborough's shallow draft made her an ideal vessel to blockade the many inlets of the Florida coast.

References 

Ships of the Union Navy
Gunboats of the United States Navy
Tenders of the United States Navy
Sloops of the United States Navy
American Civil War patrol vessels of the United States
American Civil War auxiliary ships of the United States
Shipwrecks of the American Civil War
Shipwrecks of the Florida coast
Scuttled vessels
Maritime incidents in 1862
Maritime incidents in May 1863